The 2015 Africa Cup of Nations qualification matches determined the participating teams for the 2015 Africa Cup of Nations.

A total of 16 teams competed in the 2015 Africa Cup of Nations.

Prior to November 2014, it was expected that Morocco would be the host country (and thus be pre-qualified). However, as Morocco missed the 9 November deadline for confirming their willingness to host (because of the Ebola virus epidemic in West Africa),  Morocco was expelled from the tournament. Equatorial Guinea was chosen as the new host, and despite having played in the qualifiers and been disqualified due to fielding an ineligible player, they now qualify for the tournament automatically.

Qualified teams

Format
The qualifying draw was supposed to take place in Morocco on 10 March 2013 during CAF General Assembly. However, the CAF Executive Committee decided on 8 March 2013 that the qualifying draw would be held on 31 January 2014 in South Africa in line with the 2014 African Nations Championship. However, on 28 January 2014, the draw date was reported to have changed once again. The qualifying draw was held on 27 April 2014 in Cairo, Egypt (with the exception of the preliminary round which was held on 21 February 2014 in Cairo).

A total of 51 teams entered the qualification matches (Djibouti and Somalia did not enter). After the CAF Executive Committee meeting on 24 January 2014, it was decided that the qualifiers shall be played in the format of several qualifying rounds, as well as a group stage with seven groups consisting of four teams each. The two top teams of each group then directly qualify for the finals, along with the best third place team of the seven groups. This was different from the original proposal, which consisted of a preliminary round followed by a group stage with twelve groups of four teams.

The top 21 teams listed in the CAF Ranking shall automatically qualify for the group stage. The seven other teams playing in the group stage shall be determined following the conclusion of the qualifying rounds. The ranking is computed using the teams' results in the 2013 Africa Cup of Nations finals (weighted by 3) and qualifiers, the 2012 Africa Cup of Nations finals (weighted by 2) and qualifiers (weighted by 0.5), the 2010 Africa Cup of Nations finals, and the 2014 FIFA World Cup qualifiers. If tied on points, the tiebreaker is decided by the results of the latest editions of the Africa Cup of Nations.

Below are the ranking of the 51 teams that entered the qualification matches:

Schedule
The schedule of the competition was as follows.

Qualifying rounds
In each of the qualifying rounds, teams were drawn into knock-out ties. Qualification ties were played on a home-and-away two-legged basis. If the sides were level on aggregate after the second leg, the away goals rule was applied, and if still level, the tie proceeded directly to a penalty shoot-out (no extra time was played).

Preliminary round
The draw for the preliminary round was held at the CAF Executive Committee on 21 February 2014 at Cairo, Egypt. The four teams ranked 48–51 played in this round.

|}

Mauritania won 3–0 on aggregate and advanced to the first round.

South Sudan advanced to the first round after Eritrea, who have a history of their players defecting whilst on international duty, withdrew.

First round
The draw for the first round was held on 27 April 2014 at Cairo, Egypt. The 26 teams ranked 22–47 and the two winners of the preliminary round played in this round. Teams ranked 22–35 were seeded, and teams ranked 36–47 and the two winners of the preliminary round were unseeded.

|}

Lesotho won 2–1 on aggregate and advanced to the second round.

Kenya won 2–1 on aggregate and advanced to the second round.

2–2 on aggregate. Uganda won on the away goals rule and advanced to the second round.

Equatorial Guinea won 3–1 on aggregate. However, on 3 July 2014, the CAF announced that Equatorial Guinea were disqualified for fielding the ineligible player Thierry Fidjeu in the tie, and as a result, Mauritania advanced to the second round. Equatorial Guinea later qualified for the final tournament as replacement hosts.

Congo won 3–1 on aggregate and advanced to the second round.

Rwanda won 3–0 on aggregate and advanced to the second round.

Botswana won 1–0 on aggregate and advanced to the second round.

Guinea-Bissau won 3–1 on aggregate and advanced to the second round.

Sierra Leone won 2–1 on aggregate and advanced to the second round.

Seychelles advanced to the second round after Gambia were suspended from all CAF competitions for two years for deliberately fielding overage players in the 2015 African U-20 Championship qualification match against Liberia.

Benin won 4–0 on aggregate and advanced to the second round.

3–3 on aggregate. Malawi won on the away goals rule and advanced to the second round.

Tanzania won 3–2 on aggregate and advanced to the second round.

Mozambique won 5–0 on aggregate and advanced to the second round.

Second round
The draw for the second round was held on 27 April 2014 at Cairo, Egypt. The 14 winners of the first round played in this round.

|}

Lesotho won 1–0 on aggregate and advanced to Group C.

Uganda won 3–0 on aggregate and advanced to Group E.

2–2 on aggregate. Rwanda won the penalty shoot-out. However, on 17 August 2014, the CAF announced that Rwanda were disqualified for fielding the ineligible player Daddy Birori in the tie, as it emerged that Birori had been using a different name and a Congolese passport when playing for his club side, AS Vita. As a result, Congo advanced to Group A.

Botswana won 3–1 on aggregate and advanced to Group G.

Sierra Leone advanced to Group D after Seychelles withdrew. Seychelles were forced to forfeit after the Sierra Leone team was barred by the Seychelles immigration authorities from entering the country to play the second leg for fears over the West African Ebola virus epidemic.

1–1 on aggregate. Malawi won the penalty shoot-out and advanced to Group B.

Mozambique won 4–3 on aggregate and advanced to Group F.

Group stage
The draw for the group stage was held on 27 April 2014 at Cairo, Egypt. The 21 teams ranked 1–21 and the seven winners of the second round played in this round. Teams ranked 1–7 were seeded into Pot 1, teams ranked 8–14 were seeded into Pot 2, teams ranked 15–21 were seeded into Pot 3, and the seven winners of the second round were seeded into Pot 4. The 28 teams were drawn into seven groups of four, with each group containing one team from each pot. Each group was played on a home-and-away round-robin basis. The winners and runners-up of each group, plus the best third-placed team, qualified for the finals.

Tiebreakers
The teams were ranked according to points (3 points for a win, 1 point for a draw, 0 points for a loss). If tied on points, tiebreakers were applied in the following order:
Number of points obtained in games between the teams concerned;
Goal difference in games between the teams concerned;
Goals scored in games between the teams concerned;
Away goals scored in games between the teams concerned;
If, after applying criteria 1 to 4 to several teams, two teams still had an equal ranking, criteria 1 to 4 were reapplied exclusively to the matches between the two teams in question to determine their final rankings. If this procedure did not lead to a decision, criteria 6 to 9 applied;
Goal difference in all games;
Goals scored in all games;
Away goals scored in all games;
Drawing of lots.

Group A

Group B

Group C

Group D

Group E

Group F

Group G

Ranking of third-placed teams

Goalscorers
6 goals

 Jonathan Pitroipa

5 goals

 Seydouba Soumah

4 goals

 Stéphane Sessègnon
 Vincent Aboubakar
 Salomon Kalou
 Tokelo Rantie
 Geofrey Massa

3 goals

 Yacine Brahimi
 Clinton N'Jie
 Férébory Doré
 Malick Evouna
 Mohamed Salah
 Asamoah Gyan
 Domingues
 Jeremy Bokila
 Daddy Birori

2 goals

 Riyad Mahrez
 Joel Mogorosi
 Lemponye Tshireletso
 Héldon
 Zé Luís
 Ezechiel N'Douassel
 Thievy Bifouma
 Prince Oniangue
 Yannick Bolasie
 Cédric Mongongu
 Getaneh Kebede
 Oumed Oukri
 Lévy Madinda
 Pierre-Emerick Aubameyang
 Emmanuel Agyemang-Badu
 André Ayew
 Ibrahima Traoré
 Cícero
 Idrissa Sylla
 Gervinho
 Max Gradel
 Yaya Touré
 Tsepo Seturumane
 Gabadinho Mhango
 Atusaye Nyondo
 Bakary Sako
 Mustapha Yatabaré
 Isac
 Josemar
 Sonito
 Moctar Yacouba
 Sone Aluko
 Ahmed Musa
 Aaron Samuel Olanare
 Sadio Mané
 Umaru Bangura
 Bongani Ndulula
 Sibusiso Vilakazi
 Papiss Cissé
 Mame Biram Diouf
 Kara Mbodj
 Moussa Sow
 Salah Ibrahim
 Khamis Mcha
 Emmanuel Adebayor
 Yassine Chikhaoui
 Wahbi Khazri

1 goal

 Sofiane Feghouli
 Rafik Halliche
 Carl Medjani
 Djamel Mesbah
 Islam Slimani
 Hillal Soudani
 Ary Papel
 Bastos
 Djalma Campos
 Love
 Frédéric Gounongbé
 Jerome Ramatlhakwane
 Aristide Bancé
 Alain Traoré
 Léonard Kweuke
 Stéphane Mbia
 Odaïr Fortes
 Kuca
 Ryan Mendes
 Garry Rodrigues
 Júlio Tavares
 Foxi Kéthévoama
 Rodrigue Ninga
 Yacine Saandi
 Ladislas Douniama
 Césaire Gandzé
 Sylvère Ganvoula
 Francis N'Ganga
 Junior Kabananga
 Neeskens Kebano
 Firmin Ndombe Mubele
 Mohamed Elneny
 Amr Gamal
 Dio
 Mauricio Mina
 César Augusto Rivas
 Abebaw Butako
 Saladin Said
 Yussuf Saleh
 Samson Mbingui
 Johann Obiang
 Christian Atsu
 Mubarak Wakaso
 Abdul Majeed Waris
 Mohamed Yattara
 Ansumane Faty
 Wilfried Bony
 Seydou Doumbia
 Kolo Touré
 Ayub Masika
 Johanna Omolo
 Emmanuel Lekhanya
 Bushi Moletsane
 Mabuti Potloane
 Anthony Laffor
 Carolus Andriamatsinoro
 Faneva Imà Andriatsima
 Frank Banda
 John Banda
 Essau Kanyenda
 Robin Ngalande
 Robert Ng'ambi
 Cheick Diabaté
 Abdoulay Diaby
 Seydou Keita
 Sambou Yatabaré
 Adama Ba
 Bessam
 Ismaël Diakité
 Demba Sow
 Diogo
 Kito
 Mexer
 Reginaldo
 Rudolf Bester
 Mahamane Cissé
 Moussa Maâzou
 Efe Ambrose
 Gbolahan Salami
 Ikechukwu Uche
 Meddie Kagere
 Michel Ndahinduka
 Dame N'Doye
 Moustapha Bangura
 Khalifa Jabbie
 Kei Kamara
 Mohamed Kamara
 Sulaiman Sesay-Fullah
 Thulani Serero
 Bakri Almadina
 Sidumo Shongwe
 John Bocco
 Nadir Haroub
 Mbwana Samatta
 Thomas Ulimwengu
 Serge Akakpo
 Floyd Ayité
 Jonathan Ayité
 Prince Segbefia
 Donou Kokou
 Fakhreddine Ben Youssef
 Ferjani Sassi
 Savio Kabugo
 Hamis Kiiza
 Brian Majwega
 Tony Mawejje
 Robert Ssentongo
 Rainford Kalaba
 Ronald Kampamba
 Emmanuel Mayuka
 Jacob Mulenga
 Kennedy Mweene
 Given Singuluma
 Willard Katsande
 Danny Phiri

Own goal

 Fernander Kassaï (playing against Guinea-Bissau)
 Tsoanelo Koetle (playing against Angola)
 Prince Jetoh (playing against Lesotho)
 Sadat Ouro-Akoriko (playing against Ghana)

Notes

References

External links
Orange Africa Cup Of Nations Qualifiers, CAFonline.com

 
2015
Qualification
Africa Cup of Nations qualification